

Men Compound Individual

Women Compound Individual

Men Team Compound 

 Ontario won the Gold/Silver shoot-off 20 points to 19.

Women Team Compound

Men Recurve Individual

Women Recurve Individual

Men Team Recurve

Women Team Recurve 

2007 Canada Winter Games